Sanzar Kakar is an entrepreneur and business leader. Kakar is the Chairman of AHG, an international professional business services firm.

Education 
Kakar attended elementary school at Beaconhouse Public School in Peshawar, Pakistan; middle school at Moundridge Middle School in Moundridge, Kansas; and high school at International School of Islamabad in Islamabad, Pakistan. Kakar participated or organized a number of Model United Nations conferences around the world, including in Kabul, Beijing, The Hague, Montreal, Washington, Berkeley and Sharm-e-Sheikh.

Kakar graduated from the University of Pennsylvania with a Bachelor of Science in engineering, majoring in computer science engineering and minoring in economics. Kakar worked in New Jersey and New York before moving to Kabul, Afghanistan. Kakar also completed a master's program at Warwick Business School, University of Warwick in Coventry, United Kingdom, graduating with a Master of Business Administration, focusing on entrepreneurship and finance.

Kakar has attended Executive Education programs including Harvard Business School's Owner/President Management (OPM) and the Harvard Leadership Program for Moore Global.

Career 
Kakar started with Merrill Lynch working as a Technology Analyst to develop software to automatically link to the New York Stock Exchange. In 2006, Kakar moved to Afghanistan to serve as the Investment Associate and then Country Director for Acap Partners, venture capital fund. In 2007, Kakar was appointed as the Executive Advisor to the Attorney General on the United States Department of State funded Afghanistan Justice Sector Support Program.  Kakar worked to reorganize the Attorney General's Office and created a criminal case management system spanning seven justice institutions in Afghanistan. In late 2008, Kakar served as the Economic Adviser and then Deputy Team Leader for the United Kingdom Department for International Development funded Afghanistan Investment Climate Facility, where he developed operational and fiduciary requirements for the £60 million grant fund.

In 2009, Kakar founded Afghanistan Financial Services, which primarily provided taxation services to U.S. Government contractors. The firm was featured on BBC News with John Simpson. In 2013, the firm re-branded as Afghanistan Holding Group as it expanded into auditing, research, training and legal services. Kakar was featured in 2019 on the cover of Afghanistan's business magazine, Business DNA.

Kakar has spoken about the need for formal financial markets in Afghanistan, including at the American University of Afghanistan and at TEDx Kabul 2014. A feasibility study for capital markets was supported by the United States Department of Defense Task Force for Business and Stability Operations (TFBSO). Kakar has spoken about the business environment in Afghanistan, including once on National Public Radio with Tom Ashbrook and at TEDx Kabul 2016. Kakar is an advocate for increasing foreign direct investment to Afghanistan, calling for more stability and predictability in the regulatory environment.

Between 2015 and 2020, Kakar launched nine additional companies, including Mezan Ltd, Warzish Ltd, Zinzir Ltd, Afghanet Ltd and acquired BusinessDNA Magazine. In 2020, his accountancy company joined as a full member firm of Moore Global. Moore Global is a network of 30,000 professionals across 260 independent firms working in more than 100 countries. Kakar spoke at TEDx about his goal to combine these ventures to dramatically increase employment in Afghanistan.

After the change in Government 15 August 2021, Kakar closed a number of businesses to focus on addressing the humanitarian crisis facing Afghanistan. Over 22.8 million Afghans were facing starvation, including 1 million children. Kakar's HesabPay offered a secure and vetted payment channel to get aid to those that needed it most, at a time when traditional fiat rails were not working due to banks de-risking Afghanistan.

Community service
 Code Weekend
 Startup Valley
 Startup Weekend
 Startup Grind
 Business Summit
 Founder Institute
 Rise Afghanistan
 Business Integrity Network
 American Chamber of Commerce

Articles
 For Afghanistan Compliance Requirements"
 For Afghanistan Investment and Business Guide"
 For Doing Business in Afghanistan
 For American Bar Association
 For Afghan Zariza Articles
 For ACCA Magazine
 For American Business Council Dubai

References

University of Pennsylvania School of Engineering and Applied Science alumni
Living people
Alumni of the University of Warwick
American people of Pashtun descent
Year of birth missing (living people)
American emigrants to Afghanistan
American expatriates in Pakistan